Sonoma Valley Unified School District is a public school district based in Sonoma County, California, United States. As of 2017, there are 11 schools.

References

External links
 

School districts in Sonoma County, California
Sonoma Valley